Ricardo Benjamín González Valdés (born 20 October 1977 in Monterrey) is a Mexican racing driver who competes in the FIA World Endurance Championship. In 2013, he won the 24 Hours of Le Mans in LMP2 class and 2013 FIA WEC World Champion LMP2 class for drivers and teams.

For the 2016 FIA World Endurance Championship, González shall participate as owner and pilot of the rookie Mexican team RGR Sport by Morand in the LMP2 class and confirms its participation in 2016 24 Hours of Le Mans.

Personal life 

Ricardo comes from a family of drivers; his father Roberto González Sr. finished in third place in the 12 Hours of Sebring in 1976 and his brother Roberto Jr. competed in the Champ Car World Series in 2003 and 2004. He is a father of four children and lives with his family in Mexico City. His grandfather Roberto González Barrera was the chairman of food company Gruma and bank Banorte. His daughter Roberta Luciana, at 11 years old is a 2013 National equestrian champion in Mexico.

He is the president of the foundation ASUCQ which was formed to create Arkansas State University-Campus Querétaro, a campus of the Arkansas State University System in Querétaro, Mexico. The campus opened with its first class of students on 4 September 2017.

Racing career

1994 - 95
In 1994-1995 Ricardo was the youngest driver to participate in the Mexican F3 FIA, His career began in karts in 1990.

1999 - 2000
Indy Lights Panamericana

2001

In 2001, González took part in the Formula Chrysler Euroseries as teammate to his older brother Roberto at Swiss team Alpie Motorsport. Ricardo finished the season fourth as Roberto was runner-up. In 2003 he raced in the World Series by Nissan.

2010

In 2010 he returned from a seven-year break from racing to contest the American Le Mans Series. After starting four races in the GTC class, he and teammate Luis Díaz switched to the LMPC class for the final four rounds of the season.

2011

In 2011 season González drove for Core Autosport team in the American Le Mans Series LMPC class with his co-driver Gunnar Jeannette, they got the victory in two races, GP of Long Beach and GP of Mosport, with 156 points they won the American Le Mans Series season.

2012

In 2012 he is racing in the FIA World Endurance Championship for Greaves Motorsport alongside Elton Julian and Christian Zugel.

In 24 Hours of Le Mans González and his co-drivers Julian and Zugel from Greaves Motorsport Zytek Z11SN-Nissan team, got 5th place in the LMP2 class (twelfth overall).

2013

For 2013, González was hired by OAK Morgan-Nissan to drive Morgan-Nissans in the LMP2 class on the FIA World Endurance Championship. González shares the number 35 entry with co-drivers Bertrand Baguette and Martin Plowman.

The 2013 season started at the 6 Hours of Silverstone, the OAK Racing Morgan LMP2-Nissan No. 35 finished in fourth place (twelfth overall) to get their first 10 points for the World Championship.

On the 6 Hours of Spa-Francorchamps, González, Baguette and Plowman finished in third position (for cars registered for points in the FIA World Endurance Championship), of LMP2 class (eleventh overall).

In 24 Hours of Le Mans Ricardo and his co-drivers Bertrand Baguette and Martin Plowman from OAK Racing Morgan LMP2-Nissan team, won 81st edition of the 24 Hours of Le Mans in LMP2 class (seventh overall). Their Morgan LMP2 covered a total of 329 laps in the Circuit de la Sarthe. The race was run in very difficult weather conditions and several serious accidents bringing out a record of twelve safety car caution periods. So, González became the first Mexican driver to get the first place of since Pedro Rodríguez in 1968.  González recognize to Pedro Rodríguez as his hero. Heavy rains forced race officials to start the race under safety car conditions, completing eight laps before the race was temporarily stopped due to no improvement in track conditions.

The 6 Hours of São Paulo were held at the Autódromo José Carlos Pace, on 30 August–1 September. González, Baguette and Plowman got the second place of LMP2 category, only behind Oreca 03-Nissan team (Rusinov, Martin and Conway). With this result the Mexican driver got his second podium of the year.

In the fifth round of 2013 season were the 6 Hours of Circuit of the Americas in Austin, Texas on 20–22 September. González, Baguette and Plowman obtained the seventh place of LMP2 category (eleventh overall).

On 18–20 October, in  the 6 hours of Fuji, following a two-hour delay the race was restarted once more under the safety car, lapping another eight circuits before officials stopped the race again and eventually called an end to the event. Due to difficult weather conditions half points will be awarded for all the teams and drivers in the event.

During the 6 Hours of Shanghai on 8–9 November, the No. 35 OAK Morgan-Nissan trio (Baguette, González and Plowman), qualified in fourth position and finished in third place (7th overall). With this new podium the French team extend their lead on 15 points to the final race of the championship.

On the last race of the season the 6 Hours of Bahrain on 29–30 November, González, Baguette and Plowman qualified in sixth place and finished in fourth position (sixth overall). Therefore, the Mexican Ricardo González won the 2013 FIA WEC World Championship for drivers and teams in LMP2 class.

2014

Le Castellet, France – April 2, 2014 – Ricardo González will compete in the 2014 European Le Mans Series with ART Grand Prix driving a McLaren MP4-12C GT3 in GTC class. González will run for the first time in his career in a GT3 car, which he will share with Alex Brundle and Karim Ajlani.

2015

In 2015 González returns to FIA World Endurance Championship with the Russian team G-Drive Racing along with his co-drivers Gustavo Yacamán and Pipo Derani.

2016

In 2016 González returns to FIA World Endurance Championship as owner and driver of the Mexican team RGR Sport by Morand. His co-drivers were ex Formula 1 Bruno Senna and Filipe Albuquerque.

In the 6 Hours of Silverstone the Mexican rookie team won the race in the LMP2 Class (fifth overall), incredible result in their debut as a team.

Second podium for González and the Mexican team in the 6 Hours of Nürburgring (ninth overall), only behind #36 car Signatech Alpine.

On the fifth race of the season, the 6 Hours of Mexico, the Aztec squad achieved the first place in the LMP2 class (sixth overall), with the minimal advantage of 1.985 seconds over the second place, the #36 Signatech Alpine. The car #43 started from the pole position but missing 4 hours and 4 minutes the car fell to third place due to a contact with the #26 G-Drive Racing but rallied to take the checkered flag in the rain with Albuquerque behind the wheel. The RGR Sport by Morand recorded the fastest lap on turn number 28. Great success for González as principal, driver and promoter of the event in his home soil.

24 Hours of Le Mans results

Complete FIA World Endurance Championship results

* Season in progress.

European Le Mans Series results

* Season still in progress.

References

External links
 

1978 births
Living people
Sportspeople from Monterrey
Racing drivers from Nuevo León
American Le Mans Series drivers
24 Hours of Le Mans drivers
FIA World Endurance Championship drivers
European Le Mans Series drivers
Morand Racing drivers
Greaves Motorsport drivers
OAK Racing drivers
G-Drive Racing drivers
ART Grand Prix drivers
Level 5 Motorsports drivers